Joel Bell (born July 29, 1985) is a former American football offensive lineman who signed with the Buffalo Bills in 2009. 

In 2004 Bell accepted an athletic scholarship to attend Furman University in Greenville, SC. From 2006 to 2008 as left tackle, he captured All-Conference honors each year as well as All-American honors and the Jacobs Blocking Trophy his senior year. Bell was also named to the 2007 South Carolina All-State Football Team and the 2008 College Sporting News FCS Fabulous 50 Team. In 2009 Bell played in the Texas vs. the Nation All-Star Classic and was invited to the 2009 NFL Scouting Combine. After a short stint with the Buffalo Bills in 2009 where chronic injuries lead to Bell's release, he helped lead the Saskatchewan Roughriders of the Canadian Football League to two back-to-back Grey Cup appearances.. In the 2011 UFL Draft, Bell was chosen fifth overall by the Las Vegas Locomotives and helped the team to the championship that year. After suffering what would be a career ending injury, Bell spent the 2012 season on injury reserve with the Edmonton Eskimos.
Since finishing his football career, he has completed two masters degrees from The Southern Baptist Theological Seminary, and begun a doctorate from Christ Church, University of Oxford in Hebrew and Jewish Studies.

References

External links
Furman University player bio
NFL Combine stats
Saskatchewan Roughriders bio
Edmonton Eskimos player bio

1985 births
Living people
American players of Canadian football
Canadian football offensive linemen
Edmonton Elks players
Furman Paladins football players
Las Vegas Locomotives players
Players of Canadian football from Cleveland
Saskatchewan Roughriders players
Southern Baptist Theological Seminary alumni
Alumni of Christ Church, Oxford
Players of American football from Cleveland